The Houston Aphasia Recovery Center(HARC) is a non-profit organization dedicated to helping people with aphasia.  HARC's mission is to "serve people with aphasia and their families by providing programs, education, advocacy and resources to eliminate the isolation endured when the ability to communicate is impaired."

HARC was founded in 2008 to address the lack of resources available to assist aphasia patients in learning to speak.

References

External links
 HARC homepage - non-profit aphasia recovery organization.

Sources 

Aphasia organizations
Non-profit organizations based in Houston